Events in the year 1749 in Norway.

Incumbents
 Monarch: Frederick V

Events
 24 June - The first Masonic lodge is established in Norway (Lodge St. Olaus to the white Leopard).

Arts and literature

Births
 29 January - Christian Colbjørnsen, chief justice (died 1814)
 18 March - Maren Juel, landowner (died 1815)
 29 April - Johan Randulf Bull, judge (died 1829)
 21 August - Edvard Storm, poet (died 1794)
 8 December - Peder Anker, businessman and politician (died 1824)

Deaths

References

See also